The Battle of Charleroi or the Battle of the Sambre, was fought on 21 August 1914, by the French Fifth Army and the German 2nd and 3rd armies, during the Battle of the Frontiers. The French were planning an attack across the Sambre River, when the Germans attacked first, forced back the French from the river and nearly cut off the French retreat by crossing the Meuse River around Dinant and getting behind the French right flank. The French were saved by a counter-attack at Dinant and the re-direction of the 3rd Army to the north-west in support of the 2nd Army, rather than south-west.

Battle

By 20 August, the Fifth Army (General Charles Lanrezac) had begun to concentrate on a  front along the Sambre, centred on Charleroi and extending east to the Belgian fortress of Namur. The Cavalry Corps (General André Sordet) covered the Fifth Army's left flank and the concentration of the British Expeditionary Force (BEF) at Mons. The French had 15 divisions, after transfers of troops to Lorraine, facing 18 German divisions from the 2nd Army (General Karl von Bülow) and 3rd Army (Colonel-General Max von Hausen) moving south-west from Luxembourg towards the Meuse.

21 August
In accordance with Plan XVII, the Third and Fourth armies further south were to move towards, respectively, Arlon and Neufchâteau, then seek to attack enemy forces in Belgian Luxembourg. The Fifth Army was ordered to cover the Meuse up to Namur and the British were to conform by moving in the general direction of Soignies, north-east of Mons. Lanrezac positioned the Fifth Army on the Sambre and reported his actions to Joffre later in the day, around 12:30. Unbeknownst to him, German elements had clashed with his vanguards, between Namur and Charleroi.

Lanrezac was informed by General Augustin Michel, commander at Namur, received at 14:00. Lanrezac was told by GQG around 16:00 that the Germans were still moving west, and in consequence ordered his aviation to reconnoitre enemy troop movements and informed his subordinates that they should "be ready to launch an attack [...] by crossing the Sambre, towards Namur and Nivelles." At 20:00, having reported only minor action on the 10th Corps front to Joffre at 19:00, Lanrezac was instructed by the latter that he had discretion to decide of the appropriate moment to start his offensive.

By the evening, vanguards from the 19th Division, between Floriffoux and Jemeppe-sur-Sambre, had pushed back German assaults. Reports from prisoners indicated that there was a strong German presence. Further west, Arsimont, guarded initially by a battalion and then reinforced by a regiment from the 20th Division, was abandoned by 21:00 and the easternmost elements were ordered to retreat by the corps commander, Defforges, who organized positions around Fosse in coordination with the 1st and the 3rd Corps. This meant the Germans had succeeded in crossing the Sambre.

On the 3rd Corps front, outposts of the 5th Division were attacked around 15:00. Despite initial failures, the Germans continued with their attacks and forced a passage at Tamines, Roselies and Aiseau. A French counter-attack retook Aiseau but failed in pushing the Germans back from any other bridgehead. At 23:00, the corps commander Sauret reported to Lanrezac that the 5th Division was continuing efforts to retake the bridges.

22 August

In a report the following morning, Lanrezac confirmed to Joffre the violence on the German attack on Namur. Reporting the actions of the 10th and 3rd Corps, he requested that the Fourth Army "makes itself felt as soon as possible".

On the French right flank, General d'Espèrey ordered the 1st Corps troops to make movements in preparation of an offensive action. At the same time, he hastened the relief of the 2nd Division by the 51st Reserve Division. The offensive movements were stopped by an attack of the XII Saxon Corps, which attacked advanced elements of the Dinant and Anseremme bridges. Although this attack did not prevent the relief of his own troops, Espèrey reported that he would be unable to reinforce the Sambre because of it around 13:00. Authorization to blow all Meuse bridges except those at Givet, Hastière and Dinant was asked for and granted by Lanrezac at 14:15.

Attacks were also launched by the Germans on the remainder of the Fifth Army front.

23 August

Fighting continued on 23 August when the French centre around Charleroi began to fall back.

The 3rd Army crossed the Meuse and attacked the French right flank, held by I Corps. The attack threatened to cut the line of retreat of the Fifth Army but I Corps stopped the German advance with a counter-attack. With the evacuation of Namur and news of the Fourth Army retreat from the Ardennes, Lanrezac ordered the Fifth Army to withdraw, lest he be encircled and cut off from the rest of the French army. The German army was victorious.

Aftermath

Analysis

The Fifth Army retreat after the Battle of Charleroi, arguably saved the French army from decisive defeat, as it prevented the much sought envelopment of the Schlieffen plan. After fighting another defensive action in the Battle of St Quentin, the French were pushed to within miles of Paris. Lanrezac was sacked by Joffre on 3 September (four days after General Pierre Ruffey, the Third Army commander) and replaced by d'Espèrey. The 1934 work by the French Fascist and writer Pierre Drieu La Rochelle, The Comedy of Charleroi, explores the author's role in the battle.

Casualties
In 2001, Eric Dorn Brose recorded  Army casualties and Edward Spears in the 1999 edition of Liaison 1914 (1930) recorded 11,000 German 2nd Army casualties and its capture of  prisoners and  In 2009, Holger Herwig wrote that the 3rd Army suffered  at Dinant.

Orders of battle

French
Details taken from the French official history unless specified.
 Cavalry Corps, commanded by André Sordet
 1st Cavalry Division
 3rd Cavalry Division
 5th Cavalry Division
 8th Infantry Brigade 

Fifth Army, commanded by Charles Lanrezac
 1st Army Corps, commanded by General Louis Franchet d'Espèrey
 1st Infantry Division
 2nd Infantry Division
 3rd Army Corps, commanded by General Sauret
 5th Infantry Division
 6th Infantry Division
 10th Army Corps, commanded by General Defforges
 19th Infantry Division
 20th Infantry Division
 37th Infantry Division
 18th Army Corps

German
Details from the British official history and Cron (2002) unless otherwise indicated.
 II Cavalry Corps  2/HKK 2) – preceding 1st and 2nd Armies (General der Kavallerie Georg von der Marwitz the Senior Cavalry Commander [])
 2nd Cavalry Division
 4th Cavalry Division
 9th Cavalry Division

Each Cavalry Division consisted of 3 Brigades, each of 2 Cavalry Regiments (24 squadrons total), 3 horse artillery batteries (4 guns each) and an MG detachment (6 MGs).

1st Army, commanded by  Alexander von Kluck.
 II Corps ( Alexander von Linsingen)
 3rd Division
 4th Division
 III Corps ( Ewald von Lochow)
 5th Division
 6th Division
 IV Corps ( Friedrich Bertram Sixt von Armin)
 7th Division
 8th Division
 IX Corps ( Ferdinand von Quast)
 17th Division
 18th Division
 III Reserve Corps ( Hans von Beseler)
 5th Reserve Division
 6th Reserve Division
 IV Reserve Corps ( Hans von Gronau)
 7th Reserve Division
 22nd Reserve Division
 IX Reserve Corps ( Max von Boehn) (Originally held back in Schleswig in case of British landings; moved up in late August.)
 17th Reserve Division
 18th Reserve Division
 10th Mixed  Brigade
 11th Mixed  Brigade
 27th Mixed  Brigade
  Regiment (expansion of pre-war 18th Bn)

2nd Army, commanded by  Karl von Bülow
 Guards Corps ( Karl von Plettenberg)
 1st Guards Infantry Division
 2nd Guards Infantry Division
 VII Corps ( Karl von Einem)
 13th Division
 14th Division
 X Corps ( Otto von Emmich)
 19th Division
 20th Division
 Guards Reserve Corps ( Max von Gallwitz)
 3rd Guards Infantry Division 
 1st Guards Reserve Division
 VII Reserve Corps ( Hans von Zwehl)
 13th Reserve Division
 14th Reserve Division
 X Reserve Corps ( Günther Graf von Kirchbach)
 2nd Guards Reserve Division
 19th Reserve Division
 25th Mixed  Brigade
 29th Mixed  Brigade
 4 Mortar Battalions (II & III Bns, 4th Foot Regt; I & II Bns, 9th Foot Regt)
 10-cm Gun Battalion (II Bn, 9th Reserve Foot Regt)
 2 Heavy Coastal Mortar Batteries (1st & 5th Btys)
 2 Pionier Regiments (expansion of pre-war 24th & 25th Bns)
 I Cavalry Corps – preceding 3rd Army (HKK 1,  Manfred Freiherr von Richthofen)
 Guards Cavalry Division
 5th Cavalry Division

3rd Army, commanded by  Max von Hausen
 XI Corps ( Otto von Plüskow)
 22nd Division
 38th Division
 XII (1st Royal Saxon) Corps ( Karl d'Elsa)
 23rd Division
 32nd Division
 XIX (2nd Royal Saxon) Corps ( Maximilian von Laffert)
 24th Division
 40th Division
 XII (Royal Saxon) Reserve Corps ( Hans von Kirchbach)
 23rd Reserve Division
 24th Reserve Division
 47th Mixed  Brigade
 Mortar Battalion (III Bn, 1st Foot Regt)
 Pionier Regiment (expansion of pre-war 23rd Bn)

Footnotes

References

Further reading

External links

 First World War.com
 Erwan Le Gall: Charleroi, Battle of, in: 1914-1918-online. International Encyclopedia of the First World War.

Battles of the Western Front (World War I)
Battles of World War I involving France
Battles of World War I involving Germany
Conflicts in 1914
1914 in Belgium
August 1914 events
France–Germany military relations
Charleroi
Battle